William Benjamin Felder (December 9, 1926 – October 2, 2009) was an American Negro league shortstop who played for the 1946 Negro World Series champion Newark Eagles.

A native of Tampa, Florida, Felder was a strong-fielding but light-hitting infielder. He broke into the Negro leagues in 1946 for Newark, and took the field on opening day for Baseball Hall of Famer Leon Day's no-hitter against the Philadelphia Stars. Felder split shortstop duties that season with Hall of Famer Monte Irvin, and saw action in the club's Negro World Series victory over the Kansas City Monarchs.

Felder went on to play in the minor leagues for the Key West Conchs in 1952, the Pampa Oilers in 1953, and split time with Pampa and the Artesia NuMexers in 1954. He died in Tampa in 2009 at age 82.

References

External links
 and Seamheads
 William Felder at Negro Leagues Baseball Museum

1926 births
2009 deaths
Indianapolis Clowns players
Newark Eagles players
Philadelphia Stars players
20th-century African-American sportspeople
Baseball infielders
21st-century African-American people